Ivor Le Roux (born 23 February 1976) is a Zimbabwean freestyle swimmer. He competed in three events at the 1992 Summer Olympics.

References

External links
 

1976 births
Living people
Zimbabwean male freestyle swimmers
Olympic swimmers of Zimbabwe
Swimmers at the 1992 Summer Olympics
Place of birth missing (living people)